Eretmocera laetissima is a moth of the  family Scythrididae. This species is known from Gambia, Congo, Comoros, Madagascar, Sierra Leone and South Africa.

Biology
The larvae feed on Alternanthera achyrantoides (Amaranthaceae) and Clerodendrum sp. (Verbenaceae).

References

laetissima
Moths described in 1852
Moths of Sub-Saharan Africa
Moths of the Comoros
Fauna of the Gambia